Benjamin Cueto Agarao Jr. also known as Benjie Agarao is a Filipino politician and businessman who served as Member of the Philippine House of Representatives from Laguna's 4th District from June 30, 2004, until June 30, 2007, and from June 30, 2013, until June 30, 2022.

References 

Living people
Members of the House of Representatives of the Philippines from Laguna (province)
Year of birth missing (living people)
21st-century Filipino politicians
PDP–Laban politicians
Liberal Party (Philippines) politicians
Nationalist People's Coalition politicians